Ali Akbar Natiq (born 22 December 1974) is a  Pakistani poet, novelist and short story writer. Acclaimed as one of the brightest stars in  Pakistan's literary firmament, Natiq has published many books.

Early life and education 
Ali Akbar Natiq was born at village 32/2L, in Okara District, Punjab, Pakistan. His ancestors migrated from Faizabad, near Lucknow, to Firozpur district in  Punjab at the turn of the 20th century, and then during the  partition of India in 1947, they immigrated to Pakistan, coming from Firozpur via Sulemanki Headworks, and settled in Okara. 

Natiq studied up to  matric in a high school in his village and passed  FA exam from Government College, Okara. After that, due to poor economic conditions, he started working and got his  BA and  MA degrees privately from Bahauddin Zakariya University, Multan.

Natiq started working as a  mason and skilled at building  domes,  minarets and  mosques. Meanwhile, his studies of  Urdu literature and history also continued. He also read the Arabic books which his father had brought from Iraq and Kuwait where he went on work. Whenever he got free time from work, he was busy studying. In 1998, he also stayed in Saudi Arabia and the Middle East for some time as a laborer. He learned a lot in this journey.

Career 
His first collection of poetry “Beyaqeen Bastiyon Mein” appeared in 2010, followed by a book of short stories “Qaim Deen” published by Oxford University Press in 2012. All two books have received UBL and Oxford Awards.  Penguin Random House India published the English version of the aforementioned collection of the short stories titled “What Will You Give For This Beauty?”. His story “Mason's Hand” has been featured in international literary magazine Granta in its special issue on Pakistan in 2011. In 2013, he published another book of poems “Yaqoot Ke Warq”, from which selected poems were translated into  German. His first novel “Naulakhi Kothi” was launched at 6th Karachi Literature Festival. The novel is being translated into English and is expected to be published by Penguin India and America. In 2015, after being inspired by Natiq's book Qaim Deen, Indian actor and theatre director Danish Husain adapted four of his short stories in his play “Ek Punjab Ye Bhi” which opened during the Prithvi Theatre Festival at Prithvi Theatre, Mumbai.  Natiq next published second book of short stories named “Shah Muhammad Ka Tanga” in Urdu. This book has been translated into Hindi and English in same name from Delhi by Jagarnath Publishing, India. Beside poetry and fiction, Natiq also wrote a book with a critical account on poetry of famous poet  Allama Muhammad Iqbal and a book aiming at discussing the critical aspects of the art of versification.

He was former professor of Urdu at Uswa College, Islamabad and a former assistant professor at University of Lahore, Department School of Creative Art. On 16 July 2018, the American daily newspaper The New York Times published his article on the topic of  democracy in Pakistan. He originally wrote the article in Urdu language, which was translated by Basharat Peer in English.  His second novel “Kamari Wala” was published in 2020.

Writings 
 Naulakhi Kothi (Novel) (نو لکھی کوٹھی), 2015
 Kamari Wala (Novel) (کماری والا), 2020
 Qaim Deen (Short Stories)  (قائم دین)
 Shah Muhammad Ka Tanga ( Short stories) (شاہ محمد کا ٹانگہ)
 Fakeer Basti Main Tha (فقیر بستی میں تھا)        
 Sabz Bastion Ke Ghazaal (سبز بستیوں کے غزال)       
 Be Yaqeen Bastion Main (Poetry) (بے یقین بستیوں میں)
 Yaqoot Ke Warq (Poetry) (یاقوت کے ورق)

References

External links 

 

1974 births
Living people
Punjabi people
People from Okara District
Male novelists
Male short story writers
Pakistani Muslims
Pakistani Shia Muslims
Pakistani poets
Pakistani male poets
Pakistani novelists
Pakistani male short story writers
Urdu-language short story writers
Urdu-language novelists
Urdu-language poets from Pakistan
Urdu-language writers from Pakistan
20th-century Shia Muslims
20th-century Pakistani poets
20th-century Pakistani male writers
20th-century Pakistani novelists
20th-century Pakistani short story writers
20th-century Urdu-language writers
21st-century Pakistani poets
21st-century male writers
21st-century Pakistani novelists
21st-century Pakistani short story writers
21st-century Urdu-language writers